The Tellinidae are a family of marine bivalve molluscs of the order Cardiida. Commonly known as tellins or tellens, they live fairly deep in soft sediments in shallow seas and respire using long siphons that reach up to the surface of the sediment.

Characteristics
Tellinids have rounded or oval, elongated shells, much flattened. The two valves are connected by a large external ligament. The two separate siphons are exceptionally long, sometimes several times the length of the shell. These siphons have a characteristic cruciform muscle at their base.

Selected genera

 Abranda Iredale, 1924
 Acorylus Olsson & Harbison, 1953
 Aenigmotellina Matsukuma, 1989
 Afsharius M. Huber, Langleit & Kreipl, 2015
 Agnomyax Stewart, 1930
 Alaona M. Huber, Langleit & Kreipl, 2015
 Ameritella M. Huber, Langleit & Kreipl, 2015
 Angulinides M. Huber, Langleit & Kreipl, 2015
 Angulus Megerle von Mühlfeld, 1811
 Arcopagia Leach in Brown, 1827
 Asthenometis M. Huber, Langleit & Kreipl, 2015
 † Bartrumia Marwick, 1934 
 † Barytellina Marwick, 1924 
 Bathyangulus M. Huber, Langleit & Kreipl, 2015
 Bathytellina Kuroda & Habe, 1958
 Bosemprella M. Huber, Langleit & Kreipl, 2015
 Cadella Dall, Bartsch & Rehder, 1938
 Coanyax M. Huber, Langleit & Kreipl, 2015
 Confusella M. Huber, Langleit & Kreipl, 2015
 Cyclotellina Wenz, 1923
 Cymatoica Dall, 1889  
 Dellius M. Huber, Langleit & Kreipl, 2015
 Elliptotellina Cossmann, 1886
 Eurytellina P. Fischer, 1887
 † Finlayella Laws, 1933 
 Florimetis Olsson & Harbison, 1953
 Gastrana Schumacher, 1817
 Hanleyanus M. Huber, Langleit & Kreipl, 2015
 Herouvalia Cossmann, 1892
 Idatellina M. Huber, Langleit & Kreipl, 2015
 Indentina M. Huber, Langleit & Kreipl, 2015
 Indotellina M. Huber, Langleit & Kreipl, 2015
 Jactellina Iredale, 1929
 Jitlada M. Huber, Langleit & Kreipl, 2015
 Laciolina Iredale, 1937  
 Leporimetis Iredale, 1930
 Limecola T. Brown, 1844 
 Loxoglypta Dall, Bartsch & Rehder, 1938 
 Macoma Leach, 1819  
 Macomona Finlay, 1927
 Macomopsis Sacco, 1901
 Macoploma Pilsbry & Olsson, 1941
 Merisca Dall, 1900
 Moerella P. Fischer, 1887
 Nitidotellina Scarlato, 1961
 Obtellina Iredale, 1929
 Omala Schumacher, 1817
 Oudardia Monterosato, 1884
 Pallidea M. Huber, Langleit & Kreipl, 2015
 Peronaea Poli, 1791
 Pharaonella Lamy, 1918
 Phyllodina Dall, 1900
 Praetextellina M. Huber, Langleit & Kreipl, 2015
 Pristipagia Iredale, 1936 
 Psammacoma Dall, 1900
 Psammotreta Dall, 1900
 Pseudarcopagia Bertin, 1878
 Pseudocadella M. Huber, Langleit & Kreipl, 2015
 Pseudomacalia M. Huber, Langleit & Kreipl, 2015
 Pseudopsammobia M. Huber, Langleit & Kreipl, 2015
 Pseudotellidora M. Huber, Langleit & Kreipl, 2015
 Punipagia Iredale, 1930
 Quadrans Bertin, 1878  
 Quidnipagus (Iredale, 1929)
 Scissula Dall, 1900
 Scissulina Dall, 1924
 Scutarcopagia Pilsbry, 1918
 Semelangulus Iredale, 1924
 Senegona M. Huber, Langleit & Kreipl, 2015
 Serratina Pallary, 1922 
 Strigilla Turton, 1822 
 Sylvanus M. Huber, Langleit & Kreipl, 2015  
 Tampaella M. Huber, Langleit & Kreipl, 2015
 Tellidora Mörch, 1856    
 Tellina Linnaeus, 1758
 Tellinangulus Thiele, 1934
 Tellinella Mörch, 1853
 Tellinota Iredale, 1936
 Temnoconcha Dall, 1921
 Tonganaella M. Huber, Langleit & Kreipl, 2015

References

 Powell A W B, New Zealand Mollusca, William Collins Publishers Ltd, Auckland, New Zealand 1979 
 Glen Pownall, New Zealand Shells and Shellfish, Seven Seas Publishing Pty Ltd, Wellington, New Zealand 1979 

 
Bivalve families